Vadakkke Koottala Narayanankutty Nair, commonly known as V.K.N. (7 April 1929 – 25 January 2004), was a prominent Malayalam writer, noted mainly for his highbrow satire. He wrote novels, short stories and political commentaries. His works are noted for their multi-layered humour, trenchant criticism of the socio-political classes and ability to twist the meanings of words contextually and lend a touch of magic to his language.

Biography
A native of Kerala in south India, V.K.N. was born on 7 April 1929 in Thiruvilwamala in Trichur district (now Thrissur). (C. P. Nair, one of his close friends, tells that V.K.N's correct date of birth is 7 April 1929.) After completing his matriculation, he joined the Malabar Devaswom Board and worked there for 9 years. Like a number of modern Malayalam writers such as O. V. Vijayan, V.K.N. spent many years in New Delhi (from 1959 to 1969) as an English journalist. The experiences he gained during these years, which coincided with the nascent post-independent India, are reflected in his book, Pitamahan (The Great Grandfather). V.K.N.'s first story Parajithan was published in the October 1953 issue of Mathrubhumi Weekly.

Personal life

V.K.N was married to Vedavathi Amma. They had a son Balachandran & a daughter Ranjana.

Literary life

VKN's entry into Malayalam literature was in 1950s. Like for many others, his first love had been poetry. Though, before long, he gave it up, he kept up this adolescent infatuation all through his life. And he could quote from the Megasandesha or the Ramayanam chambu as quickly and effortlessly as he could from a new generation poet. This textual proficiency did not confine to poetry or literature alone. It was generic. Anything from under the sun, from contemporary politics to primitive occultism, from modern astrophysics to Chanakya's Arthashastra, or from Das Kapital to Kamasutra, was a narrative device for him, which he brought into play in his stories and novels.

It was in the 1960s that VKN came to prominence as a writer. But, by then he had left Kerala for New Delhi, where he spent about 10 years as a journalist. The New Delhi of the 1960s had a defining role in modern Malayalam literature. It was the group of young writers who happened to come together on various professional engagements in the country's capital that made Malayalam literature, fiction in particular, what it is today. Prominent among whom were O.V. Vijayan, M. Mukundan, George Varghese Kakkanadan and M. P. Narayana Pillai. VKN "landed" in this circle. These writers used to meet regularly to thrash out literature, politics or whatever else was the topic of the day – a preparation that capacitated them to accomplish new heights in writing.

As might be expected, VKN became an unfailing member of that collective. Those interactions, evidently, helped him be conversant with the latest developments in literature and consummate his style that is full of vim and vigour. Also, it could be that it was from those gatherings that he picked out many of his prototypical characters, especially the quick-witted, but hard-up "hero", Payyan (The Guy) of his seminal work, Payyan Kathakal (The Stories of Payyan), who made inroads into the higher echelons of power and wealth using nothing but his sharp intelligence and winning demeanour.

The Delhi life in 1960s had significantly contributed to framing VKN's social outlook as well. The institutionalisation of unscrupulous political manipulations, power brokerage, corruption and the murky dealings in the corridors of power; all that to which he became a silent, nonetheless alert, head-on witness deepened his distrust of the entire social and political order. And, what he did was to make them materials for a laugh that begot another laugh, which finally spread across our body, mind and intellect. For that reason, he was labelled "humorist".
He called his novels "Pennpada", "Manchal" and "Pithamahan" "historical satires", a new genre he created.

VKN's important works are Pithamahan (The Great Grandfather), Arohanam, which literally means "The Ascend" but "Bovine Bugles" in the author's own translation, Adhikaram (The Power), Payyan Kathakal (The Stories of Payyan), Sir Chathuleecock, Kavi (The Saffron), Chathans, and Chitrakeralam (Kerala Pictures). "Humour", in none of these works, did mean just a laugh. Certainly, he made use of all that is available in the repertoire of humour: irony, satire, parody and burlesque. But, be it about the misuse of power, the abuse of female body, the libertinism of the affluent, or about the fate of the poor of the day; his narration was historically and politically many-voiced. Nothing escaped his keen-eyed scrutiny by which he puzzled readers as to how they should take it; laugh, cry or get agitated. His humour, in substance, was a lamentation on human fallacies. And, just like that, a resistance to authoritarianism of all sorts. He dispassionately chronicled the transition of society from one phase to another. And "laughed" because, like his favourite character Payyan, "he could not cry".

Positions held

Death
He died on 25 January 2004 at his residence in Thiruvilwamala. He was 74.  He was ailing for some time. The last rites were performed at Pambadi on the banks of the Bharathappuzha.

Works

Novels
Arohanam (V.K.N. himself translated this work into English with the title Bovine Bugles)
Pithamahan
Adhikaram
Anantharam
Asuravani
Penpada
Kaavi
General Chathans
Manchal
Syndicate
Orazhcha

Collections of short stories
Payyan Kathakal
Sir Chathuvinte Ruling
Hajyaru
Mananchira Test
V. K. N. Kathakal
Ambathu Kathakal
Oru Nooru Mini Kathakal
Ayyaayiravum Kooppum
Naanuaru
Payyan
Kaalaghattathile Payyan
Mandahasam
Cleopatra
Payyante Samaram
Payyante Rajavu
Mangalapuram Pootham
Kozhi
prathal

Awards

1969:  Kerala Sahitya Akademi Award – Arohanam
1978:  M. P. Paul Award – overall contributions for Malayalam literature
1982:  Kendra Sahitya Akademi Award – Payyan Kathakal
1987:  Religious Harmony Award (instituted by the Organisation of Understanding and Fraternity, New Delhi
1997:  Muttathu Varkey Award – Pitamahan

References

Further reading
 Ravi Sankar S. Nair, Haasyattinre Rastantram (The Chemistry of Humour). Kerala Bhasha Institute, 2011. (A critical study of V.K.N.)
 Mathrubhumi Books Journal. Mathrubhumi, January–February 2014. (Special issue on VKN)

1929 births
2004 deaths
People from Thrissur district
Indian male novelists
Indian male short story writers
20th-century Indian translators
Malayalam-language writers
Malayalam novelists
Malayalam short story writers
Recipients of the Sahitya Akademi Award in Malayalam
Recipients of the Kerala Sahitya Akademi Award
20th-century Indian novelists
Novelists from Kerala
20th-century Indian short story writers
20th-century Indian male writers